John C. Rayson (born March 29, 1949, in Oak Park, Illinois) is a Broward County, Florida attorney. He served as the mayor of Pompano Beach, Florida from 2004 to 2007. Prior to becoming mayor, Rayson served as a member of the Florida House of Representatives from 1990 to 2000.

He unsuccessfully sought election as a Broward County, Florida circuit judge.

On July 26, 2007, he was selected as Davie, Florida's town attorney.

Rayson was born in Oak Park, Illinois. His father Leland Rayson served in the Illinois House of Representatives. Rayson received his bachelor's degree from University of Rochester in 1971 and his law degree from Case Western Reserve University in 1974. Rayson was admitted to the Florida bar and is a Democrat.

References

Law Offices of John C. Rayson
Pompano Beach, Florida City Commission

1949 births
Living people
People from Pompano Beach, Florida
People from Oak Park, Illinois
University of Rochester alumni
Case Western Reserve University alumni
Florida lawyers
Mayors of places in Florida
Democratic Party members of the Florida House of Representatives